The Toronto subway is a system of four underground, surface, and elevated rapid transit lines in Toronto and Vaughan, Ontario, Canada, operated by the Toronto Transit Commission (TTC). It was the country's first subway system: the first line was built under Yonge Street with a short stretch along Front Street and opened in 1954 with 12 stations. Since then, the system has expanded to become Canada's largest in terms of number of stations and its second-busiest, with an average of 915,000 passenger trips each weekday recorded during the fourth quarter of 2017. There are a total of 75 operating stations with an additional 60 under construction28 of which will be street-running light rail transit (LRT) stopsand 5 scheduled for closure.

Description
, 56 of the 75 stations are accessible, with plans to ensure all stations are accessible by 2025.

 three new lines are under construction, two light rail lines and one light metro line: 

 Line 5 Eglinton, a 25-station,  line along Eglinton Avenue, scheduled to open in 2023. A  extension of the line westwards is also under construction, scheduled to open in the 2030s.
 Line 6 Finch West, a 18-stop,  line along Finch Avenue West, scheduled to open in 2023.
 Ontario Line, a 15-station,  line from Exhibition station to Science Centre station, scheduled to open in the 2030s.

Current stations

Under construction

See also
Toronto subway public art

Notes

References

 
Lists of metro stations
Subway stations
Lists of railway stations in Canada
Subway stations in Toronto